Mariano Roque Alonso is a district and city located in the Central Department, in Paraguay in the Gran Asunción metropolitan area. The city has a population of 85,000 people.

The city was founded in 1944 and is located between the Paraguay River and the Transchaco Road, some 18 kilometers away from the city of Asunción. This optimal location has allowed the city quick commercial, industrial, and social development.

The town is known because on the afternoon of February 4, 1996, a Douglas DC-8F of Lineas Aéreas del Caribe (LAC) crashed while taking off from Silvio Petirossi International Airport, killing 4 people on board and 18 people on the ground. With 22 people dead, it is the worst air accident in the history of Paraguay. See Flight 028 of Lineas Aereas del Caribe (LAC)

Mariano Roque Alonso is home to the site of the biggest annual Expo show in Paraguay where companies and industries showcase their latest products.

External links
 Portal Digital de la Ciudad de Mariano Roque Alonso
 Portal Digital de la Municipalidad Ciudad de Mariano Roque Alonso

Populated places in the Central Department
Populated places established in 1944